Helen Moody defeated Helen Jacobs in the final, 6–3, 3–6, 7–5 to win the ladies' singles tennis title at the 1935 Wimbledon Championships. Dorothy Round was the defending champion, but lost in the quarterfinals to Joan Hartigan.

The next time a player would win a Wimbledon title after saving a match point would not come until the 2005 edition.

Seeds

  Dorothy Round (quarterfinals)
  Hilde Sperling (semifinals)
  Helen Jacobs (final)
  Helen Moody (champion)
  Simonne Mathieu (quarterfinals)
  Kay Stammers (quarterfinals)
  Peggy Scriven (Third roud)
  Joan Hartigan (semifinals)

Draw

Finals

Top half

Section 1

Section 2

Section 3

Section 4

Bottom half

Section 5

Section 6

Section 7

Section 8

References

External links

Women's Singles
Wimbledon Championship by year – Women's singles
Wimbledon Championships - Singles
Wimbledon Championships - Singles